Mohit Mohan Moitra was an Indian revolutionary and Indian independence movement fighter in the 1930s.

Early life 
Mohan Moitra was born in British India at Natun Bharenga, Pabna to Hemchandra Moitra.

Revolutionary activities 
Mohan Moitra belonged to the Jugantar Party Rangpur Group. He was arrested on 2 February 1932 in Kolkata under the Arms Act Case. The police found revolver and ammunition from his house. He was deported to the Cellular Jail in Andaman Islands for five years.

He took part in the Hunger Strike of 1933 to protest against the inhuman treatment meted to the prisoners along with Mahavir Singh (convicted in Second Lahore Conspiracy Case) and Mohan Kishore Namadas (convicted in Arms Act Case) and 30 others.

Death 
He was courted martyrdom on 28 May 1933 due to the brutal force feeding process. Mahavir Singh and Mohan Kishore Namadas also died during the Hunger Strike.

References 

Indian revolutionaries
Revolutionary movement for Indian independence
Prisoners and detainees of British India
Force-feeding
1933 deaths
Indian people who died in prison custody